The 2013 AFC President's Cup was the ninth edition of the AFC President's Cup, a football competition organized by the Asian Football Confederation (AFC) for clubs from "emerging countries" in Asia. Istiqlol were the defending champions, but did not enter the tournament as teams from Tajikistan no longer entered the AFC President's Cup.

In the final, Balkan of Turkmenistan defeated KRL of Pakistan 1–0, and became the first team from Turkmenistan to win the AFC President's Cup.

Venues

Teams

The AFC laid out the procedure for deciding the participating associations, with the final decision to be made by the AFC in November 2012. The following changes to the list of participating associations may be made from the 2012 AFC President's Cup if the AFC approved the following applications made by any association:
An association originally participating in the AFC President's Cup may apply to participate in the 2013 AFC Cup.
An association originally not participating in any AFC club competitions may apply to participate in the 2013 AFC President's Cup.

The following changes in the participating associations were made compared to the previous year:
Philippine clubs' participation in the AFC President's Cup starting from 2013 was approved by the AFC.
Tajikistan clubs' participation was upgraded from the AFC President's Cup to the AFC Cup starting from 2013 by the AFC.

Each participating association was given one entry. The following teams entered the competition.

Schedule
The schedule of the competition was as follows.
Group stage: 2–12 May 2013
Final stage: 23–29 September 2013

Group stage
The draw for the group stage was held on 19 March 2013, 15:00 UTC+8, at the AFC House in Kuala Lumpur, Malaysia. The twelve teams were drawn into three groups of four. Each group was played on a single round-robin basis at a centralized venue, with Cambodia, Nepal, and the Philippines selected by the AFC to host the groups. The winners and runners-up of each group advanced to the final stage.

Tiebreakers
The teams are ranked according to points (3 points for a win, 1 point for a tie, 0 points for a loss). If tied on points, tiebreakers are applied in the following order:
Greater number of points obtained in the group matches between the teams concerned
Goal difference resulting from the group matches between the teams concerned
Greater number of goals scored in the group matches between the teams concerned
Goal difference in all the group matches
Greater number of goals scored in all the group matches
Penalty shoot-out if only two teams are involved and they are both on the field of play
Fewer score calculated according to the number of yellow and red cards received in the group matches (1 point for a single yellow card, 3 points for a red card as a consequence of two yellow cards, 3 points for a direct red card, 4 points for a yellow card followed by a direct red card)
Drawing of lots

Group A

Matches were played at Kathmandu, Nepal, from 7 to 11 May 2013 (all times UTC+5:45).

Group B

Matches were played at Cebu City, Philippines, from 8 to 12 May 2013 (all times UTC+8).

Group C

Matches were played at Phnom Penh, Cambodia, from 6 to 10 May 2013 (all times UTC+7).

Final stage
The final stage was played at a centralized venue. The matches were played at Malacca, Malaysia, from 23 to 29 September 2013 (all times UTC+8).

The draw for the final stage was held on 31 July 2013, 15:00 UTC+8, at the AFC House in Kuala Lumpur, Malaysia. The six teams were drawn into two groups of three. Each group was played on a single round-robin basis, with the same ranking rules as the group stage. The winners of each group advanced to the final. The final was played as a single match, with extra time and penalty shoot-out used to decide the winner if necessary.

Group A

Group B

Final

Awards

Top scorers

See also
2013 AFC Cup
2013 AFC Champions League

References

External links

3
2013
2013 in Cambodian football
2012–13 in Nepalese football
2013 in Philippine football
2013
2013 in Malaysian football